Justice Bliss may refer to:

John Murray Bliss, associate justice of the Supreme Court of New Brunswick
Philemon Bliss, chief justice of the Supreme Court of Dakota Territory, and associate justice of the Missouri Supreme Court
William L. Bliss, associate justice of the Iowa Supreme Court